Manuel José Luís Bucuane (born 16 August 1973), better known professionally as Tico-Tico, is a former Mozambican footballer who played as a striker. In his career, Tico-Tico played primarily for Desportivo de Maputo in Mozambique and Jomo Cosmos in South Africa.

Career
In June 2000, Tico-Tico was signed by the Tampa Bay Mutiny after playing for Jomo Cosmos.

Tico-Tico is his country's 2nd most capped player and record goal scorer. He is also the PSL's leading scorer of all-time with 108 goals. As an international footballer he represented his country at the 1996 Africa Cup of Nations, 1998 African Nations Cup and 2010 Africa Cup of Nations.

In September 2012, he was honored by the Mozambican Football Federation for his long international career. He would go on to play in a charity match in his honor where his Mozambican national side kit and football boots were sold to raise money for charitable causes.

International goals
Scores and results list Mozambique's goal tally first.

References

External links

 Tico-Tico: The most international continues on the first line 

1973 births
Living people
Sportspeople from Maputo
Mozambican footballers
Mozambique international footballers
GD Maputo players
1996 African Cup of Nations players
1998 African Cup of Nations players
2010 Africa Cup of Nations players
Mozambican expatriate footballers
Mozambican expatriate sportspeople in Portugal
Expatriate footballers in Portugal
C.F. Estrela da Amadora players
Primeira Liga players
Expatriate soccer players in South Africa
Jomo Cosmos F.C. players
Expatriate soccer players in the United States
Tampa Bay Mutiny players
SuperSport United F.C. players
Orlando Pirates F.C. players
Maritzburg United F.C. players
Association football forwards
Mozambican expatriate sportspeople in South Africa
Major League Soccer players
Mozambican expatriate sportspeople in the United States